The 1994 Torneo Descentralizado was the 79th season of the top category of Peruvian football (soccer). A total of 16 teams competed. The national champion was Sporting Cristal, beginning a run of three consecutive titles.

Changes from 1993
The Torneo Intermedio was replaced by the Torneo Apertura which qualified its champion to the 1995 Copa CONMEBOL and awarded the club two points for the Torneo Descentralizado.
The third-to-last club vs. Copa Perú runner-up relegation playoff was removed.

Teams

Torneo Apertura 
The tournament was played prior to the main Torneo Descentralizado. The group winners advanced to the playoff final. Its champion qualified for the 1995 Copa CONMEBOL.

Group A

Group B

Final 

Sporting Cristal Torneo Apertura champion; receive 2 bonus points for Torneo Descentralizado and qualified for 1995 Copa CONMEBOL. Later declines berth for Copa Libertadores berth. Runner-up Ciclista Lima competes in the Copa CONMEBOL instead.

Torneo Descentralizado 
Sporting Cristal received 2 bonus points as Torneo Apertura champions. Sporting Cristal declined their Copa CONMEBOL berth after qualifying for the Copa Libertadores at the end of the Torneo Descentralizado.

Standings

Pre-Liguilla

Liguilla 
All matches were played in Lima. Universitario started with 1 bonus point for finishing second in the Torneo Descentralizado.

External links 
 RSSSF Peru 1994 by Eli Schmerler, Carlos Manuel Nieto Tarazona

Peru
Football (soccer)
Peruvian Primera División seasons